Grange Township may refer to:

 Grange Township, Woodbury County, Iowa
 Grange Township, Pipestone County, Minnesota
 Grange Township, Deuel County, South Dakota, in Deuel County, South Dakota

See also
 LaGrange Township (disambiguation)

Township name disambiguation pages